Kelly Malveaux (born November 5, 1976) is a Canadian Football League halfback who played for the Winnipeg Blue Bombers.

Career 
Malveaux has previously played for several other CFL teams, including the Winnipeg Blue Bombers, Montreal Alouettes, Calgary Stampeders, and the Saskatchewan Roughriders.

Malveaux had a productive year for the Blue Bombers in 2008, contributing 63 tackles, two interceptions, and a sack.

On May 15, 2009, Malveaux was traded from the Winnipeg Blue Bombers to the Edmonton Eskimos for DE Fred Perry.

On February 25, 2010, Malveaux was released from the Edmonton Eskimos.

External links
Just Sports Stats

1976 births
Living people
African-American players of Canadian football
American players of Canadian football
Amsterdam Admirals players
Arizona Wildcats football players
Calgary Stampeders players
Canadian football defensive backs
Edmonton Elks players
Montreal Alouettes players
People from Bellflower, California
Saskatchewan Roughriders players
Winnipeg Blue Bombers players
Sacramento Mountain Lions players
American football defensive backs
21st-century African-American sportspeople
20th-century African-American sportspeople